This is an alphabetical list of Curaçao-related articles.

0-9

A

B

C 
Curaçao
Curaçao International Airport
Curaçao national football team
Curaçao and Dependencies
Curaçao League First Division
Curaçao Football Federation
Curaçao general election, 2010
Curaçao general election, 2012

D

E 

 Economy of Curaçao

F

G 

Government of Curaçao

H 

 History of Curaçao

I

J

K

L

M

N

O

P

Q

R

S

T

U

V

W

Y

Z

See also 

Curaçao-related lists